LoftLife is an American magazine devoted to urban shelter and design. It was launched in May 2008 by Northeast-based equity firm Modern Holdings Inc.

The concept for LoftLife was originally envisioned by Modern Holdings and a group of MBA students at Vanderbilt University, including subsequent publisher Joe Resudek.

The original vision was that of magazine that would become the Loftstyle Guide to Life in the City.  LoftLife's first issue was published in a run of 25,000 copies and was only distributed in the selected Atlanta, Georgia test market.  LoftLife maintains a regional office in Atlanta's Grant Park neighborhood, but has its main offices in New York City's Chelsea neighborhood.

References 
 Ryder, Erin (2008-5-14) "LoftLife Magazine Launches In Atlanta" PR Newswire United Business Media
 Ryder, Erin (2009-7-14) "LoftLife Releases Summer 2009 Issue on Newsstands Nationally" PR Newswire United Business Media

External links
 https://web.archive.org/web/20081211181847/http://loftlifemag.com/index.php

Lifestyle magazines published in the United States
Quarterly magazines published in the United States
Design magazines
Magazines established in 2008
Magazines published in New York City